The Afon Iwrch is a river near Llanrhaeadr-ym-Mochnant in Clwyd, Wales. Its headwaters lie on the eastern slopes of Cadair Berwyn, the highest peak of the Berwyn range, and the river flows broadly southeastwards to join the River Tanat, itself a tributary of the River Vyrnwy.

References

Rivers of Powys
2Iwrch